In economics and decision theory, a small-numbers game is a situation in an oligopolistic market in which the actions of one player have direct unforeseeable consequences for other players.

Oligopoly